Life Time is the first full-length studio album by Rollins Band, fronted by ex-Black Flag singer, Henry Rollins. The 1987 album was produced by Ian MacKaye. It was reissued in 1999, 2014 and 2021.

Production 
The album was recorded in 1987 at Off Beat Studios in Leeds, United Kingdom. It was produced by Ian MacKaye who was active in the hardcore punk scene; as a musician and co-owner of Dischord Records. Rollins was a childhood friend of MacKaye and had worked as a roadie for MacKaye's band The Teen Idles.

Release 
Life Time was originally released in 1987 and included four live tracks recorded in Kortrijk, Belgium in October 1987. 

The album was subsequently re-mastered and re-released in 1999 without the live tracks but with the addition of three tracks from the Do It album; "Do It", "Move Right In," and "Next Time".

In 2014, it was reissued on Dischord, including the original live tracks but not the 1999 bonus tracks.

In 2021, the album had a digital and limited vinyl release.

Reception

In an AllMusic review, Chris True says "When Henry Rollins emerged from the breakup of Black Flag, many thought he couldn't be successful without guitarist Greg Ginn. If nothing else, Life Time proves the detractors wrong. With Ian MacKaye of Fugazi in the production chair, Rollins Band was able to distance themselves from Black Flag with a tight, visceral, and sometimes bluesy album. While more abrasive than later Rollins Band releases, this is worth picking up to better understand the progression of Rollins Band's unique style of emotional funk metal.

Track listing (1987)

1987 original, 2014 vinyl reissue 
"Burned Beyond Recognition" - 2:56
"What Am I Doing Here?" - 3:21
"1,000 Times Blind" - 2:57
"Lonely" - 4:16
"Wreck-Age" - 5:33
"Gun in Mouth Blues" - 8:57
"You Look at You" - 3:31
"If You're Alive" - 2:42
"Turned Out" - 5:57
"What Am I Doing Here?" - 3:20†
"intro" - 1:19†
"Burned Beyond Recognition" - 2:51†
"Move Right In" - 8:34†
"Hot Animal Machine II" - 8:36†<div style="font-size:89%">† - Recorded live in Kortrijk, Belgium (October 16, 1987)

1999 reissue 
"Burned Beyond Recognition" - 2:56
"What Am I Doing Here?" - 3:21
"1,000 Times Blind" - 2:57
"Lonely" - 4:16
"Wreck-Age" - 5:33
"Gun in Mouth Blues" - 8:57
"You Look at You" - 3:31
"If You're Alive" - 2:42
"Turned Out" - 5:57
"Do It" - 2:43
"Move Right In" - 7:27
"Next Time" - 3:20

Personnel
Rollins Band
Henry Rollins – vocals
Chris Haskett – guitar
Andrew Weiss – bass guitar
Sim Cain – drums

References

External links
Dischord Records album page
Comeinandburn.com album page

1987 albums
Rollins Band albums
Buddah Records albums